Bart Wilson (born 1969) is an experimental economist. He holds the Donald P. Kennedy Endowed Chair of Economics and Law in the Chapman University, Argyros School of Business and Economics. He is also the director of the Smith Institute for Political Economy and Philosophy and teaches courses in humanomics. His work has been widely published in both the popular and academic press.

Career

Before coming to Chapman University, Wilson worked at George Mason University. Prior to his academic career, Wilson worked as an economist in the Division of Economic Policy Analysis at the Federal Trade Commission. He is also a guest lecturer at the Institute for Humane Studies.

Views
Wilson argues that economists often force "ordinary human behavior to fit their models." For Wilson, this can confuse objective economic analysis.

After research and experimentation Wilson and Vernon L. Smith conclude that "a history of unenforced property rights hinders our subjects' ability to develop the requisite personal social arrangements to support specialization and effectively exploit impersonal long-distance trade."

Wilson argues that capacity constrained firms have a vested interest in not lowering their prices for new competitive markets.

Education
 B.S.  University of Wisconsin–Eau Claire
 Ph.D. University of Arizona

Awards 
In 2017, Wilson was awarded with the Allais Memorial Prize in Behavioral Sciences during the Prague Conference on Behavioral Sciences.

Selected works
 Geography and Social Networks in Nascent Distal Exchange
 Social Preferences aren't Preferences
 Exchange and Specialisation as a Discovery Process
 Justice and Fairness in the Dictator Game
 Incremental Approaches to Establishing Trust
 Language Games of Reciprocity
 Experimental Gasoline Markets
 Fixed Revenue Auctions
 Historical Property Rights, Sociality, and the Emergence of Impersonal Exchange in Long-distance Trade
 An Experimental Investigation of Hobbesian Jungles
 Economics Works! Experiments in High School Classrooms
The Property Species: Mine, Yours, and the Human Mind

References

External links
 
 Biography at Chapman University
"Why Behavioral Economics?" - Wilson's speech at Prague Conference on Behavioral Sciences 2017: https://soundcloud.com/cebex/wilson

University of Wisconsin–Eau Claire alumni
University of Arizona alumni
George Mason University faculty
Chapman University faculty
Living people
1969 births